The English rock band the Police has released five studio albums, three live albums, seven compilation albums, 10 video albums, four soundtrack albums and 26 singles. The Police sold over 75 million records worldwide.

Albums

Studio albums

Live albums

Compilation albums

Box sets

The Six Pack collection was listed as a hit single for The Police in 1980 (under 2021 Official Chart rules it would be now categorised as an album)

Extended plays

Singles

Video albums, music video compilations and documentaries
Around the World (1982) (VHS / Laserdisc (Japan)))
Synchronicity Concert (1984) - AUS: Platinum
Every Breath You Take: The Videos (1986) - AUS: Gold
Greatest Hits (1992) [VHS and Laserdisc]
Outlandos to Synchronicities – A History of The Police Live! (1995)
Live Ghost in the Machine (1996) [Only in Japan]
The Very Best of Sting & The Police (1997)
Everyone Stares: The Police Inside Out (2006)
Reggatta de Blanc (2007)
Better Than Therapy (2008)
Certifiable: Live in Buenos Aires (2008) 
Can't Stand Losing You: Surviving The Police (2012)
Rock'n Roll... Of Corse! (2017)
Around the World (Restored & Expanded) (2022) (restored and expanded reissue (both for the first time) on blu-ray and DVD (within specific combo sets: LP+DVD, CD+blu-ray and CD+DVD) of the original 1982 documentary)

Music videos
 "Roxanne" (1978)
 "Can't Stand Losing You" (1978)
 "Message in a Bottle" (1979)
 "Walking on the Moon" (1979)
 "The Bed's Too Big Without You" (1979)
 "So Lonely" (1980)
 "Don't Stand So Close to Me" (1980)
 "De Do Do Do, De Da Da Da" (1980)
 "Spirits in the Material World" (1981)
 "One World (Not Three)" (1981)
 "Demolition Man" (1981)
 "Every Little Thing She Does Is Magic" (1981)
 "Invisible Sun" (1982)
 "Every Breath You Take" (1983)
 "Wrapped Around Your Finger" (1983)
 "Synchronicity II" (1983)
 "King of Pain" (1983)
 "Don't Stand So Close to Me '86" (1986)

See also
 Sting discography

Notes

References 

Rock music group discographies
New wave discographies
Discographies of British artists
Discography